Echeta is an unincorporated community in Campbell County in the U.S. state of Wyoming. The community is approximately 22 miles northwest of Gillette.

References

External links

Unincorporated communities in Campbell County, Wyoming
Unincorporated communities in Wyoming